The following is a list of animation shorts that is not complete.

Walt Disney Productions
Steamboat Willie (1928), Walt Disney
Plane Crazy (1928), Walt Disney
The Skeleton Dance (1929), Walt Disney
Flowers and Trees (1932), Walt Disney
Mickey's Revue  (1932), Walt Disney
The Whoopee Party (1932), Walt Disney
Three Little Pigs, (1933), Walt Disney
Orphan's Benefit (1934), Walt Disney
The Wise Little Hen (1934), Walt Disney
The Goddess of Spring (1934), Walt Disney
The Band Concert (1935), Wilfred Jackson
Mickey's Service Station (1935), Ben Sharpsteen
The Old Mill (1937), Wilfred Jackson
Don Donald (1937), Walt Disney
Clock Cleaners (1937), Ben Sharpsteen
Lonesome Ghosts (1937), Ben Sharpsteen
Brave Little Tailor (1938), Bill Roberts
Donald's Better Self (1938), Jack King
Mickey's Trailer (1938), Ben Sharpsteen
The Pointer (1939), Clyde Geronimi
Mr. Duck Steps Out (1940), Jack King
The Art of Skiing (1941), Jack Kinney
Der Fuehrer's Face (1942), Jack Kinney
Education for Death (1943), Clyde Geronimi
Hockey Homicide (1945), Jack Kinney
Chip an' Dale (1947), Jack Hannah
Motor Mania (1950), Jack Kinney
Toot, Whistle, Plunk and Boom (1953), C. August Nichols and Ward Kimball
Tangled Ever After (2012)

Warner Bros.
Bosko, the Talk-Ink Kid (1929), Hugh Harman and Rudolf Ising
Sinkin' in the Bathtub (1930), Hugh Harman and Rudolf Ising
Congo Jazz (1930), Hugh Harman and Rudolf Ising
Hold Anything (1930), Hugh Harman and Rudolf Ising
The Booze Hangs High (1930), Hugh Harman and Rudolf Ising
Box Car Blues (1930), Hugh Harman and Rudolf Ising
Big Man from the North (1931), Hugh Harman and Rudolf Ising
Ain't Nature Grand! (1931), Hugh Harman and Rudolf Ising
Ups 'n Downs (1931), Hugh Harman and Rudolf Ising
Dumb Patrol (1931), Hugh Harman and Rudolf Ising
Yodeling Yokels (1931), Hugh Harman and Rudolf Ising
Bosko's Holiday (1931), Hugh Harman and Rudolf Ising
The Tree's Knees (1931), Hugh Harman and Rudolf Ising
Lady, Play Your Mandolin! (1931), Rudolf Ising
Smile, Darn Ya, Smile! (1931), Rudolf Ising
Bosko Shipwrecked (1931), Hugh Harman
One More Time (1931), Rudolf Ising
Bosko the Doughboy (1931), Hugh Harman
You Don't Know What You're Doin'! (1931), Rudolf Ising
Bosko's Soda Fountain (1931), Hugh Harman
Hittin' the Trail for Hallelujah Land (1931), Rudolf Ising - Part of Censored Eleven
Bosko's Fox Hunt (1931), Hugh Harman
Red-Headed Baby (1931), Rudolf Ising
Bosko at the Zoo (1932), Hugh Harman
Pagan Moon (1932), Rudolf Ising
Battling Bosko (1932), Hugh Harman
Freddy the Freshman (1932), Rudolf Ising
Big-Hearted Bosko (1932), Hugh Harman
Crosby, Columbo, and Vallee (1932), Rudolf Ising
Bosko's Party (1932), Hugh Harman
Goopy Geer (1932), Rudolf Ising
Bosko and Bruno (1932), Hugh Harman
It's Got Me Again! (1932), Rudolf Ising
Moonlight for Two (1932), Rudolf Ising
Bosko's Dog Race (1932), Hugh Harman
The Queen Was in the Parlor (1932), Rudolf Ising
Bosko at the Beach (1932), Hugh Harman
I Love a Parade (1932), Rudolf Ising
Bosko's Store (1932), Hugh Harman
Bosko the Lumberjack (1932), Hugh Harman
You're Too Careless with Your Kisses! (1932), Rudolf Ising
Ride Him, Bosko! (1932), Hugh Harman
I Wish I Had Wings (1932), Rudolf Ising
Bosko the Drawback (1932), Hugh Harman
A Great Big Bunch of You (1932), Rudolf Ising
Bosko's Dizzy Date (1932), Hugh Harman
Three's a Crowd (1932), Rudolf Ising
Bosko's Woodland Daze (1932), Hugh Harman
The Shanty Where Santy Claus Lives (1933), Rudolf Ising
Bosko in Dutch (1933), Hugh Harman, Friz Freleng
One Step Ahead of My Shadow (1933), Rudolf Ising
Bosko in Person (1933), Hugh Harman, Friz Freleng
Young and Healthy (1933), Rudolf Ising
Bosko the Speed King (1933), Hugh Harman
The Organ Grinder (1933), Rudolf Ising
Wake Up the Gypsy in Me (1933), Rudolf Ising
Bosko's Knight-Mare (1933), Hugh Harman
I Like Mountain Music (1933), Rudolf Ising
Bosko the Sheep-Herder (1933), Hugh Harman
Beau Bosko (1933), Hugh Harman, Friz Freleng
Shuffle Off to Buffalo (1933), Rudolf Ising, Friz Freleng
Bosko's Mechanical Man (1933), Hugh Harman
The Dish Ran Away with the Spoon (1933), Rudolf Ising
Bosko the Musketeer (1933), Hugh Harman
Bosko's Picture Show (1933), Hugh Harman, Friz Freleng
We're in the Money (1933), Rudolf Ising
Buddy's Day Out (1933), Tom Palmer
I've Got to Sing a Torch Song (1933), Tom Palmer
Buddy's Beer Garden (1933), Earl Duvall
Buddy's Show Boat (1933), Earl Duvall
Sittin' on a Backyard Fence (1933), Earl Duvall
Buddy the Gob (1934), Friz Freleng
Pettin' in the Park (1934), Bernard Brown
Honeymoon Hotel (1934), Earl Duvall
Buddy and Towser (1934), Friz Freleng
Buddy's Garage (1934), Earl Duvall
Beauty and the Beast (1934), Friz Freleng
Those Were Wonderful Days (1934), Bernard Brown
Buddy's Trolley Troubles (1934), Friz Freleng
Goin' to Heaven on a Mule (1934), Friz Freleng
Buddy of the Apes (1934), Ben Hardaway
How Do I Know It's Sunday (1934), Friz Freleng
Buddy's Bearcats (1934), Jack King
Why Do I Dream Those Dreams (1934), Friz Freleng
The Girl at the Ironing Board (1934), Friz Freleng
The Miller's Daughter (1934), Friz Freleng
Shake Your Powder Puff (1934), Friz Freleng
Buddy the Detective (1934), Jack King
Rhythm in the Bow (1934), Ben Hardaway
Buddy the Woodsman (1934), Jack King
Buddy's Circus (1934), Jack King
Those Beautiful Dames (1934), Friz Freleng
Buddy's Adventures (1934), Ben Hardaway
Pop Goes Your Heart (1934), Friz Freleng
Viva Buddy (1934), Jack King
Buddy the Dentist (1934), Ben Hardaway
Mr. and Mrs. Is the Name (1935), Friz Freleng
Country Boy (1935), Friz Freleng
I Haven't Got a Hat (1935), Friz Freleng
Buddy's Pony Express (1935), Ben Hardaway
Buddy's Theatre (1935), Ben Hardaway
Buddy of the Legion (1935), Ben Hardaway
Along Flirtation Walk (1935), Friz Freleng
My Green Fedora (1935), Friz Freleng
Buddy's Lost World (1935), Jack King
Into Your Dance (1935), Friz Freleng
Buddy's Bug Hunt (1935), Jack King
Buddy in Africa (1935), Ben Hardaway
Country Mouse (1935), Friz Freleng
Buddy Steps Out (1935), Jack King
The Merry Old Soul (1935), Friz Freleng
Buddy the Gee Man (1935), Jack King
The Lady in Red (1935), Friz Freleng
A Cartoonist's Nightmare (1935), Jack King
Little Dutch Plate (1935), Friz Freleng
Hollywood Capers (1935), Jack King
Gold Diggers of '49 (1935), Tex Avery
Billboard Frolics (1935), Friz Freleng
Flowers for Madame (1935), Friz Freleng
I Wanna Play House (1936), Friz Freleng
The Phantom Ship (1936), Jack King
The Cat Came Back (1936), Friz Freleng
Boom Boom (1936), Jack King
Page Miss Glory (1936), Tex Avery
Alpine Antics (1936), Jack King
The Fire Alarm (1936), Jack King
The Blow Out (1936), Tex Avery
I'm a Big Shot Now (1936), Friz Freleng
Westward Whoa (1935), Jack King
Plane Dippy (1936), Tex Avery
Let It Be Me (1936), Friz Freleng
I'd Love to Take Orders from You (1936), Tex Avery
Fish Tales (1936), Jack King
Bingo Crosbyana (1936), Friz Freleng
Shanghaied Shipmates (1936), Jack King
When I Yoo Hoo (1936), Friz Freleng
Porky's Pet (1936), Jack King
I Love to Singa (1936), Tex Avery
Porky the Rain-Maker (1936), Tex Avery
Sunday Go to Meetin' Time (1936), Friz Freleng - Part of Censored Eleven
Porky's Poultry Plant (1936), Frank Tashlin
At Your Service Madame (1936), Friz Freleng
Porky's Moving Day (1936), Jack King
Toy Town Hall (1936), Friz Freleng
Milk and Money (1936), Tex Avery
Boulevardier from the Bronx (1936), Friz Freleng
Don't Look Now (1936), Tex Avery
Little Beau Porky (1936), Frank Tashlin
The Coo-Coo Nut Grove (1936), Friz Freleng
The Village Smithy (1936), Tex Avery
Porky in the North Woods (1936), Frank Tashlin
He Was Her Man (1937), Friz Freleng
Porky the Wrestler (1937), Tex Avery
Pigs Is Pigs (1937), Friz Freleng
Porky's Road Race (1937), Frank Tashlin
Picador Porky (1937), Tex Avery
I Only Have Eyes for You (1937), Tex Avery
The Fella with a Fiddle (1937), Friz Freleng
Porky's Romance (1937), Frank Tashlin
She Was an Acrobat's Daughter (1937), Friz Freleng
Porky's Duck Hunt (1937), Tex Avery
Ain't We Got Fun (1937), Tex Avery
Porky and Gabby (1937), Ub Iwerks
Clean Pastures (1937), Friz Freleng - Part of Censored Eleven
Uncle Tom's Bungalow (1937), Tex Avery - Part of Censored Eleven
Porky's Building (1937), Frank Tashlin
Streamlined Greta Green (1937), Friz Freleng
Sweet Sioux (1937), Friz Freleng
Porky's Super Service (1937), Ub Iwerks
Egghead Rides Again (1937), Tex Avery
Porky's Badtime Story (1937), Bob Clampett
Plenty of Money and You (1937), Friz Freleng
Porky's Railroad (1937), Frank Tashlin
A Sunbonnet Blue (1937), Tex Avery
Get Rich Quick Porky (1937), Bob Clampett
Speaking of the Weather (1937), Frank Tashlin
Porky's Garden (1937), Tex Avery
Dog Daze (1937), Tex Avery
I Wanna Be a Sailor (1937), Friz Freleng
Rover's Rival (1937), Bob Clampett
The Lyin' Mouse (1937), Friz Freleng
The Case of the Stuttering Pig (1937), Frank Tashlin
Little Red Walking Hood (1937), Tex Avery
Porky's Double Trouble (1937), Frank Tashlin
The Woods Are Full of Cuckoos (1937), Frank Tashlin
Porky's Hero Agency (1937), Bob Clampett
September in the Rain (1937), Friz Freleng
Daffy Duck & Egghead (1938), Tex Avery
Porky's Poppa (1938), Bob Clampett
My Little Buckaroo (1938), Friz Freleng
Porky at the Crocadero (1938), Frank Tashlin
Jungle Jitters (1938), Friz Freleng - Part of Censored Eleven
What Price Porky (1938), Bob Clampett
The Sneezing Weasel (1938), Tex Avery
Porky's Phoney Express (1938), Cal Dalton, Cal Howard
A Star is Hatched (1938), Friz Freleng
Porky's Five & Ten (1938), Bob Clampett
The Penguin Parade (1938), Tex Avery
Porky's Hare Hunt (1938), Ben Hardaway, Cal Dalton
Now That Summer is Gone (1938), Frank Tashlin
Injun Trouble (1938), Bob Clampett
The Isle of Pingo Pongo (1938), Tex Avery - Part of Censored Eleven
Porky the Fireman (1938), Frank Tashlin
Katnip Kollege (1938), Cal Dalton, Cal Howard
Porky's Party (1938), Bob Clampett
Have You Got Any Castles? (1938), Frank Tashlin
Love and Curses (1938), Ben Hardaway, Cal Dalton
Cinderella Meets Fella (1938), Tex Avery
Porky's Spring Planting (1938), Frank Tashlin
Porky & Daffy (1938), Bob Clampett
The Major Lied 'Til Dawn (1938), Frank Tashlin
Wholly Smoke (1938), Frank Tashlin
A-Lad-In Bagdad (1938), Cal Dalton, Cal Howard
Cracked Ice (1938), Frank Tashlin
A Feud There Was (1938), Tex Avery
Porky in Wackyland (1938), Bob Clampett
Little Pancho Vanilla (1938), Frank Tashlin
Porky's Naughty Nephew (1938), Bob Clampett
Johnny Smith and Poker-Huntas (1938), Tex Avery
Porky in Egypt (1938), Bob Clampett
You're an Education (1938), Frank Tashlin
The Night Watchman (1938), Chuck Jones
The Daffy Doc (1938), Bob Clampett
Daffy Duck in Hollywood (1938), Tex Avery
Porky the Gob (1938), Ben Hardaway, Cal Dalton
Count Me Out (1938), Ben Hardaway, Cal Dalton
The Mice Will Play (1938), Tex Avery
The Lone Stranger and Porky (1939), Bob Clampett
Dog Gone Modern (1939), Chuck Jones
It's an Ill Wind (1939), Ben Hardaway, Cal Dalton
Hamateur Night (1939), Tex Avery
Robin Hood Makes Good (1939), Chuck Jones
Porky's Tire Trouble (1939), Bob Clampett
Gold Rush Daze (1939), Ben Hardaway, Cal Dalton
A Day at the Zoo (1939), Tex Avery
Porky's Movie Mystery (1939), Bob Clampett
Prest-O Change-O (1939), Chuck Jones
Chicken Jitters (1939), Bob Clampett
Bars and Stripes Forever (1939), Ben Hardaway, Cal Dalton
Daffy Duck and the Dinosaur (1939), Chuck Jones
Porky and Teabiscuit (1939), Ben Hardaway, Cal Dalton
Thugs with Dirty Mugs (1939), Tex Avery
Kristopher Kolumbus Jr. (1939), Bob Clampett
Naughty but Mice (1939), Chuck Jones
Believe It or Else (1939), Tex Avery
Polar Pals (1939), Bob Clampett
Hobo Gadget Band (1939), Ben Hardaway, Cal Dalton
Scalp Trouble (1939), Bob Clampett
Old Glory (1939), Chuck Jones
Porky's Picnic (1939), Bob Clampett
Dangerous Dan McFoo (1939), Tex Avery
Snowman's Land (1939), Chuck Jones
Wise Quacks (1939), Bob Clampett
Hare-um Scare-um (1939), Ben Hardaway, Cal Dalton
Detouring America (1939), Tex Avery
Little Brother Rat (1939), Chuck Jones
Porky's Hotel (1939), Bob Clampett
Sioux Me (1939), Ben Hardaway, Cal Dalton
Land of the Midnight Fun (1939), Tex Avery
Jeepers Creepers (1939), Bob Clampett
Naughty Neighbors (1939), Bob Clampett
The Little Lion Hunter (1939), Chuck Jones
The Good Egg (1939), Chuck Jones
Pied Piper Porky (1939), Bob Clampett
Fresh Fish (1939), Tex Avery
Fagin's Freshman (1939), Ben Hardaway, Cal Dalton
Porky the Giant Killer (1939), Ben Hardaway, Cal Dalton
Sniffles and the Bookworm (1939), Chuck Jones
Screwball Football (1939), Tex Avery
The Film Fan (1939), Bob Clampett
The Curious Puppy (1939), Chuck Jones
Porky's Last Stand (1940), Bob Clampett
The Early Worm Gets the Bird (1940), Tex Avery
Africa Squeaks (1940), Bob Clampett
Mighty Hunters (1940), Chuck Jones
Busy Bakers (1940), Ben Hardaway, Cal Dalton
Ali-Baba Bound (1940), Bob Clampett
Elmer's Candid Camera (1940), Chuck Jones
Pilgrim Porky (1940), Bob Clampett
Cross Country Detours (1940), Tex Avery
Confederate Honey (1940), Friz Freleng
The Bear's Tale (1940), Tex Avery
Slap-Happy Pappy (1940), Bob Clampett
Porky's Poor Fish (1940), Bob Clampett
The Hardship of Miles Standish (1940), Friz Freleng
Sniffles Takes a Trip (1940), Chuck Jones
You Ought to Be in Pictures (1940), Friz Freleng
A Gander at Mother Goose (1940), Tex Avery
Tom Thumb in Trouble (1940), Chuck Jones
The Chewin' Bruin (1940), Bob Clampett
Circus Today (1940), Tex Avery
Little Blabbermouse (1940), Friz Freleng
Porky's Baseball Broadcast (1940), Friz Freleng
The Egg Collector (1940), Chuck Jones
A Wild Hare (1940), Tex Avery
Ghost Wanted (1940), Chuck Jones
Patient Porky (1940), Bob Clampett
Ceiling Hero (1940), Tex Avery
Malibu Beach Party (1940), Friz Freleng
Calling Dr. Porky (1940), Friz Freleng
Stage Fright (1940), Chuck Jones
Prehistoric Porky (1940), Bob Clampett
Holiday Highlights (1940), Tex Avery
Good Night, Elmer (1940), Chuck Jones
The Sour Puss (1940), Bob Clampett
Wacky Wildlife (1940), Tex Avery
Bedtime for Sniffles (1940), Chuck Jones
Porky's Hired Hand (1940), Friz Freleng
Of Fox and Hounds (1940), Tex Avery
The Timid Toreador (1940), Bob Clampett, Norman McCabe
Shop Look & Listen (1940), Friz Freleng
Elmer's Pet Rabbit (1941), Chuck Jones
Porky's Snooze Reel (1941), Bob Clampett, Norman McCabe
The Fighting 69½th (1941), Friz Freleng
Sniffles Bells the Cat (1941), Chuck Jones
The Haunted Mouse (1941), Tex Avery
The Crackpot Quail (1941), Tex Avery
The Cat's Tale (1941), Friz Freleng
Joe Glow, the Firefly (1941), Chuck Jones
Tortoise Beats Hare (1941), Tex Avery
Porky's Bear Facts (1941), Friz Freleng
Goofy Groceries (1941), Bob Clampett
Toy Trouble (1941), Chuck Jones
Porky's Preview (1941), Tex Avery
The Trial of Mr. Wolf (1941), Friz Freleng
Porky's Ant (1941), Chuck Jones
Farm Frolics (1941), Bob Clampett
Hollywood Steps Out (1941), Tex Avery
A Coy Decoy (1941), Bob Clampett
Hiawatha's Rabbit Hunt (1941), Friz Freleng
Porky's Prize Pony (1941), Chuck Jones
The Wacky Worm (1941), Friz Freleng
Meet John Doughboy (1941), Bob Clampett
The Heckling Hare (1941), Tex Avery
Inki and the Lion (1941), Chuck Jones
Aviation Vacation (1941), Tex Avery
We, the Animals Squeak! (1941), Bob Clampett
Sport Chumpions (1941), Friz Freleng
The Henpecked Duck (1941), Bob Clampett
Snowtime for Comedy (1941), Chuck Jones
All This and Rabbit Stew (1941), Tex Avery - Part of Censored Eleven
Notes to You (1941), Friz Freleng
The Brave Little Bat (1941), Chuck Jones
The Bug Parade (1941), Tex Avery
Robinson Crusoe, Jr. (1941), Norman McCabe
Rookie Revue (1941), Friz Freleng
Saddle Silly (1941), Chuck Jones
Porky's Midnight Matinee (1941), Chuck Jones
The Cagey Canary (1941), Bob Clampett
Rhapsody in Rivets (1941), Friz Freleng
Wabbit Twouble (1941), Bob Clampett
Porky's Pooch (1941), Bob Clampett
Hop Skip and a Chump (1942), Friz Freleng
Porky's Pastry Pirates (1942), Friz Freleng
The Bird Came C.O.D. (1942), Chuck Jones
Aloha Hooey (1942), Tex Avery
Who's Who in the Zoo (1942), Norman McCabe
Porky's Cafe (1942), Chuck Jones
Conrad the Sailor (1942), Chuck Jones
Crazy Cruise (1942), Tex Avery
The Wabbit Who Came to Supper (1942), Bob Clampett
Saps in Chaps (1942), Friz Freleng
Horton Hatches the Egg (1942), Bob Clampett
Dog Tired (1942), Chuck Jones
Daffy's Southern Exposure (1942), Norman McCabe
The Wacky Wabbit (1942), Bob Clampett
The Draft Horse (1942), Chuck Jones
Lights Fantastic (1942), Friz Freleng
Nutty News (1942), Bob Clampett
Hold the Lion, Please (1942), Chuck Jones
Hobby Horse-Laffs (1942), Norman McCabe
Gopher Goofy (1942), Norman McCabe
Double Chaser (1942), Friz Freleng
Bugs Bunny Gets the Boid (1942), Bob Clampett
Wacky Blackout (1942), Bob Clampett
Foney Fables (1942), Friz Freleng
The Ducktators (1942), Norman McCabe
The Squawkin' Hawk (1942), Chuck Jones
Fresh Hare (1942), Friz Freleng
Eatin' on the Cuff (1942), Bob Clampett
Fox Pop (1942), Chuck Jones
The Impatient Patient (1942), Norman McCabe
The Dover Boys (1942), Chuck Jones
The Hep Cat (1942), Bob Clampett
The Sheepish Wolf (1942), Friz Freleng
The Daffy Duckaroo (1942), Norman McCabe
The Hare-Brained Hypnotist (1942), Friz Freleng
A Tale of Two Kitties (1942), Bob Clampett
Ding Dog Daddy (1942), Friz Freleng
My Favorite Duck (1942), Chuck Jones
Case of the Missing Hare (1942), Chuck Jones
Coal Black and de Sebben Dwarfs (1943), Bob Clampett - Part of Censored Eleven
Confusions of a Nutzy Spy (1943), Norman McCabe
Pigs in a Polka (1943), Friz Freleng
Tortoise Wins by a Hare (1943), Bob Clampett
To Duck or Not to Duck (1943), Chuck Jones
The Fifth-Column Mouse (1943), Friz Freleng
Flop Goes the Weasel (1943), Chuck Jones
Hop and Go (1943), Norman McCabe
Super-Rabbit (1943), Chuck Jones
The Unbearable Bear (1943), Chuck Jones
The Wise Quacking Duck (1943), Bob Clampett
Greetings Bait (1943), Friz Freleng
Tokio Jokio (1943), Norman McCabe
Yankee Doodle Daffy (1943), Friz Freleng
Jack-Wabbit and the Beanstalk (1943), Friz Freleng
The Aristo-Cat (1943), Chuck Jones
Wackiki Wabbit (1943), Chuck Jones
Porky Pig's Feat (1943), Frank Tashlin
Tin Pan Alley Cats (1943), Bob Clampett - Part of Censored Eleven
Scrap Happy Daffy (1943), Frank Tashlin
Hiss and Make Up (1943), Friz Freleng
A Corny Concerto (1943), Bob Clampett
Fin'n Catty (1943), Chuck Jones
Falling Hare (1943), Bob Clampett
Inki and the Minah Bird (1943), Chuck Jones
Daffy - The Commando (1943), Friz Freleng
An Itch in Time (1943), Bob Clampett
Puss n' Booty (1943), Frank Tashlin
Little Red Riding Rabbit (1944), Friz Freleng
What's Cookin' Doc? (1944), Bob Clampett
Meatless Flyday (1944), Friz Freleng
Tom Turk and Daffy (1944), Chuck Jones
Bugs Bunny and the Three Bears (1944), Chuck Jones
I Got Plenty of Mutton (1944), Frank Tashlin
The Weakly Reporter (1944), Chuck Jones
Tick Tock Tuckered (1944), Bob Clampett
Bugs Bunny Nips the Nips (1944), Friz Freleng
Swooner Crooner (1944), Frank Tashlin
Russian Rhapsody (1944), Bob Clampett
Duck Soup to Nuts (1944), Friz Freleng
Angel Puss (1944), Chuck Jones - Part of Censored Eleven
Slightly Daffy (1944), Friz Freleng
Hare Ribbin' (1944), Bob Clampett
Brother Brat (1944), Frank Tashlin
Hare Force (1944), Friz Freleng
From Hand to Mouse (1944), Chuck Jones
Birdy and the Beast (1944), Bob Clampett
Buckaroo Bugs (1944), Bob Clampett
Goldilocks and the Jivin' Bears (1944), Friz Freleng - Part of Censored Eleven
Plane Daffy (1944), Frank Tashlin
Lost and Foundling (1944), Chuck Jones
Booby Hatched (1944), Frank Tashlin
The Old Grey Hare (1944), Bob Clampett
The Stupid Cupid (1944), Frank Tashlin
Stage Door Cartoon (1944), Friz Freleng
Odor-able Kitty (1945), Chuck Jones
Herr Meets Hare (1945), Friz Freleng
Draftee Daffy (1945), Bob Clampett
The Unruly Hare (1945), Frank Tashlin
Trap Happy Porky (1945), Chuck Jones
Life with Feathers (1945), Friz Freleng
Behind the Meat-Ball (1945), Frank Tashlin
Hare Trigger (1945), Friz Freleng
Ain't That Ducky (1945), Friz Freleng
A Gruesome Twosome (1945), Bob Clampett
Tale of Two Mice (1945), Frank Tashlin
Wagon Heels (1945), Bob Clampett
Hare Conditioned (1945), Chuck Jones
Fresh Airedale (1945), Chuck Jones
The Bashful Buzzard (1945), Bob Clampett
Peck Up Your Troubles (1945), Friz Freleng
Hare Tonic (1945), Chuck Jones
Nasty Quacks (1945), Frank Tashlin
Book Revue (1946), Bob Clampett
Baseball Bugs (1946), Friz Freleng
Holiday for Shoestrings (1946), Friz Freleng
Quentin Quail (1946), Chuck Jones
Baby Bottleneck (1946), Bob Clampett
Hare Remover (1946), Frank Tashlin
Daffy Doodles (1946), Robert McKimson
Hollywood Canine Canteen (1946), Robert McKimson
Hush, My Mouse (1946), Chuck Jones
Hair-Raising Hare (1946), Chuck Jones
Kitty Kornered (1946), Bob Clampett
Hollywood Daffy (1946), Friz Freleng
Acrobatty Bunny (1946), Robert McKimson
The Eager Beaver (1946), Chuck Jones
The Great Piggy Bank Robbery (1946), Bob Clampett
Bacall to Arms (1946), Arthur Davis
Of Thee I Sting (1946), Friz Freleng
Walky Talky Hawky (1946), Robert McKimson
Racketeer Rabbit (1946), Friz Freleng
Fair and Worm-er (1946), Chuck Jones
The Big Snooze (1946), Bob Clampett
The Mouse-Merized Cat (1946), Robert McKimson
Mouse Menace (1946), Arthur Davis
Rhapsody Rabbit (1946), Friz Freleng
Roughly Squeaking (1946), Chuck Jones
One Meat Brawl (1947), Robert McKimson
The Goofy Gophers (1947), Arthur Davis
The Gay Anties (1947), Friz Freleng
Scent-imental Over You (1947), Chuck Jones
A Hare Grows in Manhattan (1947), Friz Freleng
Birth of a Notion (1947), Robert McKimson
Tweetie Pie (1947), Friz Freleng
Rabbit Transit (1947), Friz Freleng
Hobo Bobo (1947), Robert McKimson
Along Came Daffy (1947), Friz Freleng
Inki at the Circus (1947), Chuck Jones
Easter Yeggs (1947), Robert McKimson
Crowing Pains (1947), Robert McKimson
A Pest in the House (1947), Chuck Jones
The Foxy Duckling (1947), Arthur Davis
House Hunting Mice (1947), Chuck Jones
Little Orphan Airedale (1947), Chuck Jones
Doggone Cats (1947), Arthur Davis
Slick Hare (1947), Friz Freleng
Mexican Joyride (1947), Arthur Davis
Catch as Cats Can (1947), Arthur Davis
A Horse Fly Fleas (1947), Robert McKimson
Gorilla My Dreams (1948), Robert McKimson
Two Gophers from Texas (1948), Arthur Davis
A Feather in His Hare (1948), Chuck Jones
What Makes Daffy Duck? (1948), Arthur Davis
What's Brewin', Bruin? (1948), Chuck Jones
Daffy Duck Slept Here (1948), Robert McKimson
A Hick a Slick and a Chick (1948), Arthur Davis
Back Alley Oproar (1948), Friz Freleng
I Taw a Putty Tat (1948), Friz Freleng
Rabbit Punch (1948), Chuck Jones
Hop, Look and Listen (1948), Robert McKimson
Nothing But the Tooth (1948), Arthur Davis
Buccaneer Bunny (1948), Friz Freleng
Bone Sweet Bone (1948), Arthur Davis
Bugs Bunny Rides Again (1948), Friz Freleng
The Rattled Rooster (1948), Arthur Davis
The Up-Standing Sitter (1948), Robert McKimson
The Shell Shocked Egg (1948), Robert McKimson
Haredevil Hare (1948), Chuck Jones
You Were Never Duckier (1948), Chuck Jones
Dough Ray Me-ow (1948), Arthur Davis
Hot Cross Bunny (1948), Robert McKimson
The Pest That Came to Dinner (1948), Arthur Davis
Hare Splitter (1948), Friz Freleng
Odor of the Day (1948), Arthur Davis
The Foghorn Leghorn (1948), Robert McKimson
A-Lad-In His Lamp (1948), Robert McKimson
Daffy Dilly (1948), Chuck Jones
Kit for Cat (1948), Friz Freleng
The Stupor Salesman (1948), Arthur Davis
Riff Raffy Daffy (1948), Arthur Davis
My Bunny Lies over the Sea (1948), Chuck Jones
Scaredy Cat (1948), Chuck Jones
Wise Quackers (1949), Friz Freleng
Hare Do (1949), Friz Freleng
Holiday for Drumsticks (1949), Arthur Davis
Awful Orphan (1949), Chuck Jones
Porky Chops (1949), Arthur Davis
Mississippi Hare (1949), Chuck Jones
Paying the Piper (1949), Robert McKimson
Daffy Duck Hunt (1949), Robert McKimson
Rebel Rabbit (1949), Robert McKimson
Mouse Wreckers (1949), Chuck Jones
High Diving Hare (1949), Friz Freleng
The Bee-Deviled Bruin (1949), Chuck Jones
Curtain Razor (1949), Friz Freleng
Bowery Bugs (1949), Arthur Davis
Mouse Mazurka (1949), Friz Freleng
Long-Haired Hare (1949), Chuck Jones
Henhouse Henery (1949), Robert McKimson
Knights Must Fall (1949), Friz Freleng
Bad Ol' Putty Tat (1949), Friz Freleng
The Grey Hounded Hare (1949), Robert McKimson
Often an Orphan (1949), Chuck Jones
The Windblown Hare (1949), Robert McKimson
Dough for the Do-Do (1949), Friz Freleng
Fast and Furry-ous (1949), Chuck Jones
Each Dawn I Crow (1949), Friz Freleng
Frigid Hare (1949), Chuck Jones
Swallow the Leader (1949), Robert McKimson
Bye, Bye Bluebeard (1949), Arthur Davis
For Scent-imental Reasons (1949), Chuck Jones
Hippety Hopper (1949), Robert McKimson
Which Is Witch (1949), Friz Freleng
Bear Feat (1949), Chuck Jones
Rabbit Hood (1949), Chuck Jones
A Ham in a Role (1949), Robert McKimson
Home Tweet Home (1950), Friz Freleng
Hurdy-Gurdy Hare (1950), Robert McKimson
Boobs in the Woods (1950), Robert McKimson
Mutiny on the Bunny (1950), Friz Freleng
The Lion's Busy (1950), Friz Freleng
The Scarlet Pumpernickel (1950), Chuck Jones
Homeless Hare (1950), Chuck Jones
Strife with Father (1950), Robert McKimson
The Hypo-Chondri-Cat (1950), Chuck Jones
Big House Bunny (1950), Friz Freleng
The Leghorn Blows at Midnight (1950), Robert McKimson
His Bitter Half (1950), Friz Freleng
An Egg Scramble (1950), Robert McKimson
What's Up, Doc? (1950), Robert McKimson
All a Bir-r-r-rd (1950), Friz Freleng
8 Ball Bunny (1950), Chuck Jones
It's Hummer Time (1950), Robert McKimson
Golden Yeggs (1950), Friz Freleng
Hillbilly Hare (1950), Robert McKimson
Dog Gone South (1950), Chuck Jones
The Ducksters (1950), Chuck Jones
A Fractured Leghorn (1950), Robert McKimson
Bunker Hill Bunny (1950), Friz Freleng
Canary Row (1950), Friz Freleng
Stooge for a Mouse (1950), Friz Freleng
Pop 'im Pop! (1950), Robert McKimson
Bushy Hare (1950), Robert McKimson
Caveman Inki (1950), Chuck Jones
Dog Collared (1950), Robert McKimson
Rabbit of Seville (1950), Chuck Jones
Two's a Crowd (1950), Chuck Jones
Hare We Go (1951), Robert McKimson
A Fox in a Fix (1951), Robert McKimson
Canned Feud (1951), Friz Freleng
Rabbit Every Monday (1951), Friz Freleng
Putty Tat Trouble (1951), Friz Freleng
Corn Plastered (1951), Robert McKimson
Bunny Hugged (1951), Chuck Jones
Scentimental Romeo (1951), Chuck Jones
A Bone for a Bone (1951), Friz Freleng
The Fair-Haired Hare (1951), Friz Freleng
A Hound for Trouble (1951), Chuck Jones
Early to Bet (1951), Robert McKimson
Rabbit Fire (1951), Chuck Jones
Room and Bird (1951), Friz Freleng
Chow Hound (1951), Chuck Jones
French Rarebit (1951), Robert McKimson
The Wearing of the Grin (1951), Chuck Jones
Leghorn Swoggled (1951), Robert McKimson
His Hare-Raising Tale (1951), Friz Freleng
Cheese Chasers (1951), Chuck Jones
Lovelorn Leghorn (1951), Robert McKimson
Tweety's S.O.S. (1951), Friz Freleng
Ballot Box Bunny (1951), Friz Freleng
A Bear for Punishment (1951), Chuck Jones
Sleepy Time Possum (1951), Robert McKimson
Drip-Along Daffy (1951), Chuck Jones
Big Top Bunny (1951), Robert McKimson
Tweet Tweet Tweety (1951), Friz Freleng
The Prize Pest (1951), Robert McKimson
Who's Kitten Who (1952), Robert McKimson
Operation: Rabbit (1952), Chuck Jones
Feed the Kitty (1952), Chuck Jones
Gift Wrapped (1952), Friz Freleng
Foxy by Proxy (1952), Friz Freleng
Thumb Fun (1952), Robert McKimson
14 Carrot Rabbit (1952), Friz Freleng
Little Beau Pepé (1952), Chuck Jones
Kiddin' The Kitten (1952), Robert McKimson
Water, Water Every Hare (1952), Chuck Jones
Little Red Rodent Hood (1952), Friz Freleng
Sock a Doodle Do (1952), Robert McKimson
Beep, Beep (1952), Chuck Jones
The Hasty Hare (1952), Chuck Jones
Ain't She Tweet (1952), Friz Freleng
The Turn-Tale Wolf (1952), Robert McKimson
Cracked Quack (1952), Friz Freleng
Oily Hare (1952), Robert McKimson
Hoppy Go Lucky (1952), Robert McKimson
Going! Going! Gosh! (1952), Chuck Jones
A Bird in a Guilty Cage (1952), Friz Freleng
Mouse-Warming (1952), Chuck Jones
Rabbit Seasoning (1952), Chuck Jones
The EGGcited Rooster (1952), Robert McKimson
Tree for Two (1952), Friz Freleng
The Super Snooper (1952), Robert McKimson
Rabbit's Kin (1952), Robert McKimson
Terrier Stricken (1952), Chuck Jones
Fool Coverage (1952), Robert McKimson
Hare Lift (1952), Friz Freleng
Don't Give Up the Sheep (1953), Chuck Jones
Snow Business (1953), Friz Freleng
A Mouse Divided (1953), Friz Freleng
Forward March Hare (1953), Chuck Jones
Kiss Me Cat (1953), Chuck Jones
Duck Amuck (1953), Chuck Jones
Upswept Hare (1953), Robert McKimson
A Peck o' Trouble (1953), Robert McKimson
Fowl Weather (1953), Friz Freleng
Muscle Tussle (1953), Robert McKimson
Southern Fried Rabbit (1953), Friz Freleng
Ant Pasted (1953), Friz Freleng
Much Ado About Nutting (1953), Chuck Jones
There Auto Be a Law (1953), Robert McKimson
Hare Trimmed (1953), Friz Freleng
Tom Tom Tomcat (1953), Friz Freleng
Wild Over You (1953), Chuck Jones
Duck Dodgers in the 24½th Century (1953), Chuck Jones
Bully for Bugs (1953), Chuck Jones
Plop Goes the Weasel (1953), Robert McKimson
Cat-Tails for Two (1953), Robert McKimson
A Street Cat Named Sylvester (1953), Friz Freleng
Zipping Along (1953), Chuck Jones
Lumber Jack-Rabbit (1953), Chuck Jones
Duck! Rabbit, Duck! (1953), Chuck Jones
Easy Peckins (1953), Robert McKimson
Catty Cornered (1953), Friz Freleng
Of Rice and Hen (1953), Robert McKimson
Cats Aweigh! (1953), Robert McKimson
Robot Rabbit (1953), Friz Freleng
Punch Trunk (1953), Chuck Jones
Dog Pounded (1954), Friz Freleng
Captain Hareblower (1954), Friz Freleng
I Gopher You (1954), Friz Freleng
Feline Frame-Up (1954), Chuck Jones
Wild Wife (1954), Robert McKimson
No Barking (1954), Chuck Jones
Bugs and Thugs (1954), Friz Freleng
The Cat's Bah (1954), Chuck Jones
Design for Leaving (1954), Robert McKimson
Bell Hoppy (1954), Robert McKimson
No Parking Hare (1954), Robert McKimson
Dr. Jerkyl's Hide (1954), Friz Freleng
Claws for Alarm (1954), Chuck Jones
Little Boy Boo (1954), Robert McKimson
Devil May Hare (1954), Robert McKimson
Muzzle Tough (1954), Friz Freleng
The Oily American (1954), Robert McKimson
Bewitched Bunny (1954), Chuck Jones
Satan's Waitin' (1954), Friz Freleng
Stop! Look! And Hasten! (1954), Chuck Jones
Yankee Doodle Bugs (1954), Friz Freleng
Gone Batty (1954), Robert McKimson
Goo Goo Goliath (1954), Friz Freleng
By Word of Mouse (1954), Friz Freleng
From A to Z-Z-Z-Z (1954), Chuck Jones
Quack Shot (1954), Robert McKimson
My Little Duckaroo (1954), Chuck Jones
Sheep Ahoy (1954), Chuck Jones
Baby Buggy Bunny (1954), Chuck Jones
Pizzicato Pussycat (1955), Friz Freleng
Feather Dusted (1955), Robert McKimson
Pests for Guests (1955), Friz Freleng
Beanstalk Bunny (1955), Chuck Jones
All Fowled Up (1955), Robert McKimson
Stork Naked (1955), Friz Freleng
Lighthouse Mouse (1955), Robert McKimson
Sahara Hare (1955), Friz Freleng
Sandy Claws (1955), Friz Freleng
The Hole Idea (1955), Robert McKimson
Ready, Set, Zoom! (1955), Chuck Jones
Hare Brush (1955), Friz Freleng
Past Perfumance (1955), Chuck Jones
Tweety's Circus (1955), Friz Freleng
Rabbit Rampage (1955), Chuck Jones
Lumber Jerks (1955), Friz Freleng
This Is a Life? (1955), Friz Freleng
Double or Mutton (1955), Chuck Jones
Jumpin' Jupiter (1955), Chuck Jones
A Kiddie's Kitty (1955), Friz Freleng
Hyde and Hare (1955), Friz Freleng
Dime to Retire (1955), Robert McKimson
Speedy Gonzales (1955), Friz Freleng
Knight-mare Hare (1955), Chuck Jones
Two Scent's Worth (1955), Chuck Jones
Red Riding Hoodwinked (1955), Friz Freleng
Roman Legion-Hare (1955), Friz Freleng
Heir-Conditioned (1955), Friz Freleng
Guided Muscle (1955), Chuck Jones
Pappy's Puppy (1955), Friz Freleng
One Froggy Evening (1955), Chuck Jones
Bugs' Bonnets (1956), Chuck Jones
Too Hop to Handle (1956), Robert McKimson
Weasel Stop (1956), Robert McKimson
The High and the Flighty (1956), Robert McKimson
Broom-Stick Bunny (1956), Chuck Jones
Rocket Squad (1956), Chuck Jones
Tweet and Sour (1956), Friz Freleng
Heaven Scent (1956), Chuck Jones
Mixed Master (1956), Robert McKimson
Rabbitson Crusoe (1956), Friz Freleng
Gee Whiz-z-z-z-z-z-z (1956), Chuck Jones
Tree Cornered Tweety (1956), Friz Freleng
The Unexpected Pest (1956), Robert McKimson
Napoleon Bunny-Part (1956), Friz Freleng
Tugboat Granny (1956), Friz Freleng
Stupor Duck (1956), Robert McKimson
Barbary Coast Bunny (1956), Chuck Jones
Rocket-bye Baby (1956), Chuck Jones
Half-Fare Hare (1956), Robert McKimson
Raw! Raw! Rooster! (1956), Robert McKimson
The Slap-Hoppy Mouse (1956), Robert McKimson
A Star Is Bored (1956), Friz Freleng
Deduce, You Say (1956), Chuck Jones
Yankee Dood It (1956), Friz Freleng
Wideo Wabbit (1956), Robert McKimson
There They Go-Go-Go! (1956), Chuck Jones
Two Crows from Tacos (1956), Friz Freleng
The Honey-Mousers (1956), Robert McKimson
To Hare Is Human (1956), Chuck Jones
Three Little Bops (1957), Friz Freleng
Tweet Zoo (1957), Friz Freleng
Scrambled Aches (1957), Chuck Jones
Ali Baba Bunny (1957), Chuck Jones
Go Fly a Kit (1957), Chuck Jones
Tweety and the Beanstalk (1957), Friz Freleng
Bedeviled Rabbit (1957), Robert McKimson
Boyhood Daze (1957), Chuck Jones
Cheese It, the Cat! (1957), Robert McKimson
Fox-Terror (1957), Robert McKimson
Tweety and the Beanstalk (1957), Friz Freleng
Piker's Peak (1957), Friz Freleng
Steal Wool (1957), Chuck Jones
Boston Quackie (1957), Robert McKimson
What's Opera, Doc? (1957), Chuck Jones
Tabasco Road (1957), Robert McKimson
Birds Anonymous (1957), Friz Freleng
Ducking the Devil (1957), Robert McKimson
Bugsy and Mugsy (1957), Friz Freleng
Zoom and Bored (1957), Chuck Jones
Greedy for Tweety (1957), Friz Freleng
Touché and Go (1957), Chuck Jones
Show Biz Bugs (1957), Friz Freleng
Mouse-Taken Identity (1957), Robert McKimson
Gonzales' Tamales (1957), Friz Freleng
Rabbit Romeo (1957), Robert McKimson
Don't Axe Me (1958), Robert McKimson
Tortilla Flaps (1958), Robert McKimson
Hare-Less Wolf (1958), Friz Freleng
A Pizza Tweety Pie (1958), Friz Freleng
Robin Hood Daffy (1958), Chuck Jones
Hare-Way to the Stars (1958), Chuck Jones
Whoa, Be-Gone! (1958), Chuck Jones
A Waggily Tale (1958), Friz Freleng
Feather Bluster (1958), Robert McKimson
Now Hare This (1958), Robert McKimson
To Itch His Own (1958), Chuck Jones
Dog Tales (1958), Robert McKimson
Knighty Knight Bugs (1958), Friz Freleng
Weasel While You Work (1958), Robert McKimson
A Bird in a Bonnet (1958), Friz Freleng
Hook, Line and Stinker (1958), Chuck Jones
Pre-Hysterical Hare (1958), Robert McKimson
Gopher Broke (1958), Robert McKimson
Hip Hip-Hurry! (1958), Chuck Jones
Cat Feud (1958), Chuck Jones
Baton Bunny (1959), Chuck Jones, Abe Levitow
Mouse-Placed Kitten (1959), Robert McKimson
China Jones (1959), Robert McKimson
Hare-Abian Nights (1959), Ken Harris
Trick or Tweet (1959), Friz Freleng
The Mouse That Jack Built (1959), Robert McKimson
Apes of Wrath (1959), Friz Freleng
Hot-Rod and Reel! (1959), Chuck Jones
A Mutt in a Rut (1959), Robert McKimson
Backwoods Bunny (1959), Robert McKimson
Really Scent (1959), Abe Levitow
Mexicali Shmoes (1959), Friz Freleng
Tweet and Lovely (1959), Friz Freleng
Wild and Woolly Hare (1959), Friz Freleng
Cat's Paw (1959), Robert McKimson
Here Today, Gone Tamale (1959), Friz Freleng
Bonanza Bunny (1959), Robert McKimson
A Broken Leghorn (1959), Robert McKimson
Wild About Hurry (1959), Chuck Jones
A Witch's Tangled Hare (1959), Abe Levitow
Unnatural History (1959), Abe Levitow
Tweet Dreams (1959), Friz Freleng
People Are Bunny (1959), Robert McKimson
Fastest with the Mostest (1960), Chuck Jones
West of the Pesos (1960), Robert McKimson
Horse Hare (1960), Friz Freleng
Wild Wild World (1960), Robert McKimson
Goldimouse and the Three Cats (1960), Friz Freleng
Person to Bunny (1960), Friz Freleng
Who Scent You? (1960), Chuck Jones
Hyde and Go Tweet (1960), Friz Freleng
Rabbit's Feat (1960), Chuck Jones
Crockett-Doodle-Do (1960), Robert McKimson
Mouse and Garden (1960), Friz Freleng
Ready, Woolen and Able (1960), Chuck Jones
Mice Follies (1960), Robert McKimson
From Hare to Heir (1960), Friz Freleng
The Dixie Fryer (1960), Robert McKimson
Hopalong Casualty (1960), Chuck Jones
Trip for Tat (1960), Friz Freleng
Dog Gone People (1960), Robert McKimson
High Note (1960), Chuck Jones
Lighter Than Hare (1960), Friz Freleng
Cannery Woe (1961), Robert McKimson
Zip 'N Snort (1961), Chuck Jones
Hoppy Daze (1961), Robert McKimson
The Mouse on 57th Street (1961), Chuck Jones
Strangled Eggs (1961), Robert McKimson
Birds of a Father (1961), Robert McKimson
D' Fightin' Ones (1961), Friz Freleng
The Abominable Snow Rabbit (1961), Chuck Jones, Maurice Noble
Lickety-Splat (1961), Chuck Jones, Abe Levitow
A Scent of the Matterhorn (1961), Chuck Jones
Rebel Without Claws (1961), Friz Freleng
Compressed Hare (1961), Chuck Jones, Maurice Noble
The Pied Piper of Guadalupe (1961), Friz Freleng, Hawley Pratt
Prince Violent (1961), Friz Freleng, Hawley Pratt
Daffy's Inn Trouble (1961), Robert McKimson
What's My Lion? (1961), Robert McKimson
Beep Prepared (1961), Chuck Jones, Maurice Noble
The Last Hungry Cat (1961), Friz Freleng, Hawley Pratt
Nelly's Folly (1961), Chuck Jones, Abe Levitow, Maurice Noble
Wet Hare (1962), Robert McKimson
A Sheep in the Deep (1962), Chuck Jones, Maurice Noble
Fish and Slips (1962), Robert McKimson
Quackodile Tears (1962), Arthur Davis
Crow's Feat (1962), Friz Freleng, Hawley Pratt
Mexican Boarders (1962), Friz Freleng, Hawley Pratt
Bill of Hare (1962), Robert McKimson
Zoom at the Top (1962), Chuck Jones, Maurice Noble
The Slick Chick (1962), Robert McKimson
Louvre Come Back to Me! (1962), Chuck Jones, Maurice Noble
Honey's Money (1962), Friz Freleng
The Jet Cage (1962), Friz Freleng
Mother Was a Rooster (1962), Robert McKimson
Good Noose (1962), Robert McKimson
Shiskabugs (1962), Friz Freleng
Martian Through Georgia (1962), Chuck Jones, Abe Levitow, Maurice Noble
I Was a Teenage Thumb (1963), Chuck Jones, Maurice Noble
Devil's Feud Cake (1963), Friz Freleng
Fast Buck Duck (1963), Robert McKimson, Ted Bonnicksen
The Million Hare (1963), Robert McKimson
Mexican Cat Dance (1963), Friz Freleng
Now Hear This (1963), Chuck Jones, Maurice Noble
Woolen Under Where (1963), Phil Monroe, Richard Thompson
Hare-Breadth Hurry (1963), Chuck Jones, Maurice Noble
Banty Raids (1963), Robert McKimson
Chili Weather (1963), Friz Freleng
The Unmentionables (1963), Friz Freleng
Aqua Duck (1963), Robert McKimson
Mad as a Mars Hare (1963), Chuck Jones, Maurice Noble
Claws in the Lease (1963), Robert McKimson
Transylvania 6-5000 (1963), Chuck Jones, Maurice Noble
To Beep or Not to Beep (1963), Chuck Jones, Maurice Noble
Dumb Patrol (1964), Gerry Chiniquy
A Message to Gracias (1964), Robert McKimson
Bartholomew Versus the Wheel (1964), Robert McKimson
Freudy Cat (1964), Robert McKimson
Dr. Devil and Mr. Hare (1964), Robert McKimson
Nuts and Volts (1964), Friz Freleng
The Iceman Ducketh (1964), Phil Monroe, Maurice Noble
War and Pieces (1964), Chuck Jones, Maurice Noble
Hawaiian Aye Aye (1964), Gerry Chiniquy
False Hare (1964), Robert McKimson
Señorella and the Glass Huarache (1964), Hawley Pratt
Pancho's Hideaway (1964), Friz Freleng, Hawley Pratt
Road to Andalay (1964), Friz Freleng, Hawley Pratt
It's Nice to Have a Mouse Around the House (1965), Friz Freleng, Hawley Pratt
Cats and Bruises (1965), Friz Freleng, Hawley Pratt
The Wild Chase (1965), Friz Freleng, Hawley Pratt
Moby Duck (1965), Robert McKimson
Assault and Peppered (1965), Robert McKimson
Well Worn Daffy (1965), Robert McKimson
Suppressed Duck (1965), Robert McKimson
Corn on the Cop (1965), Irv Spector
Rushing Roulette (1965), Robert McKimson
Run, Run, Sweet Road Runner (1965), Rudy Larriva
Tease for Two (1965), Robert McKimson
Tired and Feathered (1965), Rudy Larriva
Boulder Wham! (1965), Rudy Larriva
Chili Corn Corny (1965), Robert McKimson
Just Plane Beep (1965), Rudy Larriva
Hairied and Hurried (1965), Rudy Larriva
Go Go Amigo (1965), Robert McKimson
Highway Runnery (1965), Rudy Larriva
Chaser on the Rocks (1965), Rudy Larriva
The Astroduck (1966), Robert McKimson
Shot and Bothered (1966), Rudy Larriva
Out and Out Rout (1966), Rudy Larriva
Mucho Locos (1966), Robert McKimson
The Solid Tin Coyote (1966), Rudy Larriva
Mexican Mousepiece (1966), Robert McKimson
Clippety Clobbered (1966), Rudy Larriva
Daffy Rents (1966), Robert McKimson
A-Haunting We Will Go (1966), Robert McKimson
Snow Excuse (1966), Robert McKimson
A Squeak in the Deep (1966), Robert McKimson
Feather Finger (1966), Robert McKimson
Swing Ding Amigo (1966), Robert McKimson
Sugar and Spies (1966), Robert McKimson
A Taste of Catnip (1966), Robert McKimson
Daffy's Diner (1967), Robert McKimson
Quacker Tracker (1967), Rudy Larriva
The Music Mice-Tro (1967), Rudy Larriva
The Spy Swatter (1967), Rudy Larriva
Speedy Ghost to Town (1967), Alex Lovy
Rodent to Stardom (1967), Alex Lovy
Go Away Stowaway (1967), Alex Lovy
Cool Cat (1967), Alex Lovy
Merlin the Magic Mouse (1967), Alex Lovy
Fiesta Fiasco (1967), Alex Lovy
Hocus Pocus Pow Wow (1968), Alex Lovy
Norman Normal (1968), Alex Lovy
Big Game Haunt (1968), Alex Lovy
Skyscraper Caper (1968), Alex Lovy
Hippydrome Tiger (1968), Alex Lovy
Feud with a Dude (1968), Alex Lovy
See Ya Later Gladiator (1968), Alex Lovy
3 Ring Wing-Ding (1968), Alex Lovy
Flying Circus (1968), Alex Lovy
Chimp and Zee (1968), Alex Lovy
Bunny and Claude (1968), Robert McKimson
The Great Carrot Train Robbery (1969), Robert McKimson
Fistic Mystic (1969), Robert McKimson
Rabbit Stew and Rabbits Too! (1969), Robert McKimson
Shamrock and Roll (1969), Robert McKimson
Bugged by a Bee (1969), Robert McKimson
Injun Trouble (1969), Robert McKimson

Fleischer Studios/Famous Studios
Swing You Sinners!  (1930), Dave Fleischer
Bimbo's Initiation  (1931), Dave Fleischer
Minnie the Moocher (1932), Dave Fleischer
Snow White  (1933), Dave Fleischer
Poor Cinderella (1934), Dave Fleischer
A Dream Walking (1934), Dave Fleischer
Somewhere in Dreamland (1936), Dave Fleischer
Popeye the Sailor Meets Sindbad the Sailor (1936), Dave Fleischer
Goonland (1938), Dave Fleischer
Superman (1941), Dave Fleischer
Me Musical Nephews (1942), Seymour Kneitel, Famous Studios

Eighth Film the Studio
Metroimgilet (1915)
Fox Foxy (1918)

M. J. Winkler
Felix Finds Out (1924), Pat Sullivan
Fiery Fireman (1928), Friz Freleng and Rudolph Ising
Yanky Clippers (1929), Walter Lantz and Tom Palmer
Sick Cylinders (1929), Ben Clopton
Alpine Antics (1929), Tom Palmer
Jungle Jingles (1929), Ben Clopton
Weary Willies (1929), Friz Freleng

MGM
Peace on Earth (1939), Hugh Harman
The Milky Way (1940), Rudolf Ising
Puss Gets the Boot (1940), William Hanna and Joseph Barbera
The Midnight Snack (1941), William Hanna and Joseph Barbera
The Night Before Christmas (1941), William Hanna and Joseph Barbera
The Yankee Doodle Mouse (1943), William Hanna and Joseph Barbera
Dumb-Hounded (1943), Tex Avery
Red Hot Riding Hood (1943), Tex Avery
Mouse Trouble (1944), William Hanna and Joseph Barbera
Quiet Please! (1945), William Hanna and Joseph Barbera
Solid Serenade (1946), William Hanna and Joseph Barbera
The Cat Concerto (1947), William Hanna and Joseph Barbera
Dr. Jekyll and Mr. Mouse (1947), William Hanna and Joseph Barbera
King-Size Canary (1947), Tex Avery
The Little Orphan (1948), William Hanna and Joseph Barbera
The Two Mouseketeers (1951), William Hanna and Joseph Barbera
Johann Mouse (1953), William Hanna and Joseph Barbera

Walter Lantz Productions
Race Riot, (1929), Walter Lantz
The Plumber, (1933), Bill Nolan
Confidence, (1933), Bill Nolan
Ham and Eggs, (1933) Bill Nolan
Parking Space, (1933) Bill Nolan
The County Fair, (1934) Bill Nolan
Knock Knock (1940), Walter Lantz
The Barber of Seville (1944), James Culhane
Apple Andy (1946), Dick Lundy
Musical Moments from Chopin (1947), Dick Lundy
Sh-h-h-h-h-h (1955), Tex Avery
Crazy Mixed-Up Pup (1955), Tex Avery
The Legend of Rockabye Point (1955), Tex Avery

Terrytoons/Van Beuren
The Window Washers (1925), Harry Bailey, John Foster, Frank Moser, Jerry Shields 
Closer Than a Brother (1925), Harry Bailey, John Foster, Frank Moser, Jerry Shields
Small Town Sheriff (1927), Harry Bailey, John Foster, Frank Moser, Jerry Shields
River of Doubt (1927), Paul Terry
Dinner Time (1928), Paul Terry and John Foster
The Wild Goose Chase (1932), John Foster and Mannie Davis
Silvery Moon (1933), John Foster and Mannie Davis
Farmer Al Falfa's Prize Package (1936), Mannie Davis and George Gordon
Skunked Again (1936), Mannie Davis and George Gordon
Red Hot Music (1937), Mannie Davis and George Gordon
The Hay Ride (1937), Mannie Davis and George Gordon
The Mouse of Tomorrow (1942), Eddie Donnelly
My Boy, Johnny (1943), Paul Terry
Mighty Mouse in Gypsy Life (1945), Eddie Donnelly
The Talking Magpies (1946), Mannie Davis
Flebus (1956), Gene Deitch
Tom Terrific (1957), Gene Deitch
Sidney's Family Tree (1958), Gene Deitch

Charles Mintz/Screen Gems (Columbia)
Ratskin (1929), Ben Harrison and Manny Gould
Farm Relief (1929), Ben Harrison, cartoonist, Manny Gould and Friz Freleng
Toby the Showman (1930), Dick Huemer and Sid Marcus
Down South (1931), Dick Huemer and Sid Marcus
Weenie Roast (1931), Ben Harrison and Manny Gould
Yelp Wanted (1931), Dick Huemer
Piano Mover (1931), Ben Harrison and Manny Gould
Birth of Jazz, Ben Harrison and Manny Gould
Russian Dressing, Ben Harrison and Manny Gould
Krazy Spooks (1933), Ben Harrison and Manny Gould
The Bill Poster (1933), Ben Harrison and Manny Gould
Holiday Land (1934), Sid Marcus and Art Davis
The Little Match Girl (1937), Sid Marcus and Art Davis
The Fox and the Grapes (1941), Frank Tashlin
Song of Victory (1942), Bob Wickersham
Willoughby's Magic Hat (1943), Bob Wickersham
Flora (1948), Alex Lovy

UPA
Hell-Bent for Election (1944), Chuck Jones
Brotherhood of Man (1946), Bobe Cannon
Ragtime Bear (1949), John Hubley
Gerald McBoing-Boing (1951), Bobe Cannon
Rooty Toot Toot (1952), John Hubley
The Tell-Tale Heart (1953), Ted Parmelee (direction), Paul Julian (design)
When Magoo Flew (1955), Pete Burness

Others
Fiddlesticks (1930), Ub Iwerks
Room Runners (1932), Ub Iwerks
The Goose That Laid the Golden Egg (1936), Burt Gillett
The Pink Phink (1964), Friz Freleng, DePatie–Freleng Enterprises
Voodoo Love Story (2015), Giuseppe Rossi
In a Heartbeat (film) (2017), Ringling College of Art and Design

Lists of animated short films